Matthew or Matt Johnson may refer to:

Film and television
 Matt Johnson (actor) (born 1974), American actor and comedian
 Matt Johnson (director) (born 1985), Canadian writer, director, actor, editor and producer
 Matt Johnson (TV presenter) (born 1982), Welsh television presenter
 Matt Johnson, protagonist played by Jan-Michael Vincent in the 1978 surfing movie Big Wednesday
 Matt Johnson, writer of the film Torque

Music 
 Matt Johnson (singer) (born 1961), British singer for the band The The
 Matt Johnson (keyboardist) (born 1969), British keyboardist for the funk band Jamiroquai
 Matt Johnson (drummer) (born 1970), American drummer for Jeff Buckley
 Matt Johnson (country singer) (born 1996), American country singer from Dallas, Texas
 Matt Johnson (One True Voice), British singer, member of the group One True Voice
 Matt Johnson, guitarist in the band The Autumn Offering
 Matt Johnson, bassist for the band Chainsaw Kittens
 Matt Johnson, drummer for the band Fat Tulips
 Matt Johnson, keyboardist for the band Matt and Kim
 Matthew Johnson, co-founder of Fat Possum Records

Sports
 Matt Johnson (Australian footballer) (born 1959), Australian rules footballer for Footscray
 Matt Johnson (basketball) (born circa 1969), American basketball player
 Matt Johnson (ice hockey) (born 1975), Canadian ice hockey player
 Matt Johnson (safety) (born 1989), American football player
 Matt Johnson (quarterback) (born 1992), American football quarterback
 Matthew Johnson (rugby union) (born 1994), New Zealand rugby union player
 Matthew Johnson (Australian footballer) (born 2003), Australian rules footballer for Fremantle

Others
 Matt Johnson (North Dakota politician) (1871–1935), newspaper publisher and Republican politician from North Dakota
 Matthew Johnson (judge) (born 1963), Minnesota Court of Appeals judge
 Matthew Steven Johnson (born 1963), American serial killer and rapist
 Matthew S. Johnson (born 1966), professor of chemistry at Copenhagen University
 Matt Johnson (artist) (born 1978), sculptor in Los Angeles
 Matthew Johnson (plant biologist)

See also
 Mat Johnson (born 1970), American writer
 List of people with surname Johnson